Reel Tight was an American R&B group composed of Chattanooga, Tennessee natives Bobby Kane, Bobby Rice, Danny Johnson and Reggie Long.

The group was discovered by rapper and producer Warren G in 1996, who then signed them to his G-Funk Entertainment label. Reel Tight's first appearance came on Warren G's "Relax Ya Mind" from his 1997 album Take a Look Over Your Shoulder. Two year later, their debut album Back to the Real was released, however, both the album and its lead single, "I Want U", failed to make an impact. Both made brief appearances on the Billboard charts before dropping off the charts less than a month later. They would make their final appearance on Warren G's I Want It All later in 1999 before disappearing from the music industry.

Discography

African-American musical groups
American contemporary R&B musical groups
American vocal groups
American boy bands
Musical groups established in 1997
Musical groups disestablished in 1999